Iron sulfide or Iron sulphide can refer to range of chemical compounds composed of iron and sulfur.

Minerals
By increasing order of stability: 
 Iron(II) sulfide, FeS
 Greigite, Fe3S4 (cubic)
 Pyrrhotite, Fe1−xS (where x = 0 to 0.2) (monoclinic or hexagonal)
 Troilite, FeS, the endmember of pyrrhotite (hexagonal)
 Mackinawite, Fe1+xS (where x = 0 to 0.1) (tetragonal)
 Marcasite, orthorhombic FeS2
 Pyrite, cubic FeS2 (fool's gold)
 Arsenopyrite (mispickel), FeAsS, or Fe(As-S), Fe(III) mixed arseno-sulfide (monoclinic)

Synthetic
 Iron(III) sulfide, Fe2S3
 Iron-sulfur clusters, includes both synthetic and biological

Biological
 Iron–sulfur protein

Iron compounds
Iron minerals
Sulfur(−II) compounds
Sulfides
Sulfide minerals
Non-stoichiometric compounds